Astylos of Croton (Ἄστυλος/Ἀστύαλος ὁ Κροτωνιάτης) was an athlete from ancient Croton who starred in the Olympic Games of the 5th century BC. He was mentioned in records from General Pausanias that claim he excelled in three successive Olympic games from 488 to 480 BC, in the running events of stadion and diaulos. Diodorus Siculus calls him Astylos of Syracuse and uses his third victory to date the Persian invasion in 480 BC. In Italy, Astylos was famous for equaling the achievements of previous champion athlete Chionis of Sparta. Astylos matched the achievements of Chionis by winning the stadion and diaulos events on three occasions, as well as winning the hoplitodromos event.

Despite his fame, Astylos died a lonely man. When he agreed to participate in the 484 and 480 BC Olympic games as a Syracusan citizen in honor of the tyrant Hieron, the people of Croton expelled him from the city and demolished his statue in their city. It is also said that Astylos was bribed by officials in Syracuse to compete under their name, making Astylos the world's first free agent. His house was also turned into a prison as a sign of disrespect, while his family also renounced him.

See also 
List of Olympic winners of the Stadion race

References

Sources
 
 Foundation of the Hellenic World (FHW), The Olympic Victors

5th-century BC Greek people
Ancient Crotonian athletes
Ancient Syracusans
Ancient Olympic competitors